On the Jump is a 1918 American silent comedy film directed by Raoul Walsh and starring George Walsh, Frances Burnham and James A. Marcus. A journalist resigns from a newspaper when it is taken over a pro-German sympathiser, and sets out to expose him as a German agent.

Cast
 George Walsh as Jack Bartlett 
 Frances Burnham as Margaret Desmond 
 James A. Marcus as William Desmond 
 Henry Clive as Otto Crumley 
 Ralph Faulkner as President Woodrow Wilson

References

Bibliography
 Solomon, Aubrey. The Fox Film Corporation, 1915-1935: A History and Filmography. McFarland, 2011.

External links
 

1918 films
1910s English-language films
American silent feature films
Silent American comedy films
American black-and-white films
Films directed by Raoul Walsh
Fox Film films
1918 comedy films
1910s American films